E. E. Knight (born March 7, 1965) is the pen name for American science fiction and fantasy writer Eric Frisch, born in La Crosse, Wisconsin. He grew up in Stillwater, Minnesota and now resides in Oak Park, Illinois, with his wife and children.

In May 2007, he donated his archive to the department of Rare Books and Special Collections at Northern Illinois University.

Bibliography

Vampire Earth series
 Way of the Wolf (2003)
 Choice of the Cat (2004)
 Tale of the Thunderbolt (2005)
 Valentine's Rising (2005)
 Valentine's Exile (2006)
 Valentine's Resolve (2007)
 Fall With Honor (2008)
 Winter Duty (2009)
 March in Country (2011)
 Appalachian Overthrow (2013)
 Baltic Gambit (2014)

Age of Fire series
 Dragon Champion (2005)
 Dragon Avenger (2006)
 Dragon Outcast (2007)
 Dragon Strike (2008)
 Dragon Rule (2009) 
 Dragon Fate (2011)

Dragoneer Academy series
 Novice Dragoneer (2019)
 Daughter of the Serpentine (2020)

Standalone Novels
 Lara Croft Tomb Raider: The Lost Cult (2004)

Series

Vampire Earth
 
In the Vampire Earth series, aliens from a world known as Kur have taken over the world, destroying human society and enslaving the survivors. The novels follow the life of David Valentine, a young man who enlists with Southern Command, one of the few remnants of the old U.S. government scattered around, as he follows his heart even when it conflicts with orders.

Age of Fire

The Age of Fire series takes place in a world where dragons exist, but are becoming extinct. Civilization is under attack by barbarians from the north. Each of the first three novels in the series follows the life of one of three dragon siblings from fireless hatchlings to soaring dragons. The next three books follow the dragon siblings as they attempt to bring dragons back to the world.

Dragoneer Academy

The Dragoneer Academy series is a subsequent series that takes place in the same world as Age of Fire, years later. In the Dragoneer Academy a young girl, Ileth, applies to become a Novice in the Serpentine Academy in order to become a Dragon Rider. There she meets a very old dragon who, while not explicitly revealed by name, is very likely DharSii from the Age of Fire series.

Awards
 Way of the Wolf (2004) Compton Crook Award, Novel
 Way of the Wolf (2004) Darrell, Novel
 Valentine's Exile (2007) Dal Coger Memorial Hall of Fame, Novel

Interviews
Interview with E.E. Knight at FlamesRising.com. (May 2006)
Interview with E.E. Knight at SFFWorld.com. (May 2005)
EE Knight Talks Dragons and EE Knight Interview at Bookspotcentral.com
 Interview with E. E. Knight at Lili's Lair. (July  2009)
 Questions and Answers with E. E. Knight at Hortorian.com. (May 2011)

References

External links

 E.E. Knight at Fantasy Literature

21st-century American novelists
American fantasy writers
American male novelists
American science fiction writers
1965 births
Living people
21st-century American male writers